The St. Louis San Francisco (Frisco) Railway Coach #661 is a historic railroad car.  It was built in 1883 by the Barney and Smith Car Company of Dayton, Ohio, and served for many years on the St. Louis–San Francisco Railway.  When built, it had wood sides and a canvas top; in 1936 the wood siding was covered with steel, and the roof is now a rounded fiberglass mesh that resembles the original canvas.  It was acquired in 1996 by the Paperton Junction Southern Railway and restored.  It is a rare surviving example of a 19th-century railroad car, with a separate compartment (mandated by Jim Crow laws) for African-American travelers.

The car was listed on the National Register of Historic Places in 2006.  At that time, it was located at the Paperton Junction Southern Railway rail yard in Pine Bluff, Arkansas.

See also
National Register of Historic Places listings in Jefferson County, Arkansas

References

Buildings and structures completed in 1883
National Register of Historic Places in Pine Bluff, Arkansas
Railway vehicles on the National Register of Historic Places in Arkansas
Transportation in Pine Bluff, Arkansas
Barney and Smith Car Company
St. Louis–San Francisco Railway
Rail passenger cars of the United States